Founded in 1965, the foundation's key role is to support the leading medical and health research conducted at The Queen Elizabeth Hospital and the Basil Hetzel Institute for Translational Health Research to improve the health of the South Australian community.

The foundation supports medical research through major program grants, research grants, the purchase of laboratory equipment, and by providing financial support and scholarships to postgraduate, honours and vacation research students.

Major areas of revenue to support medical research are:
 Donations
 Lotteries
 Fund-raising events
 Bequests

History

The foundation (originally called The Queen Elizabeth Hospital Research Foundation) was established in 1965, and was one of the first of its kind in South Australia.

In 2010 The Hospital Research Foundation established the brand and logo in use today.  The tag line, ‘finding cures, improving care’ is an integral part of the logo and summarises the core purpose and focus of the foundation.

Programs

Australian Breast Cancer Research
Focused on supporting research into the detection, management and treatment of breast cancer and in turn, help reduce the impact of this cancer upon Australian families. The research funded is both clinical and laboratory based.

Australian Prostate Cancer
Established to assist with the funding of vital medical research into the detection and treatment of prostate cancer, as well as preventing the spread of the disease.  This program funds clinical and laboratory based research conducted at the Basil Hetzel Institute for Translational Health Research and The Queen Elizabeth Hospital in South Australia.

Australian Heart Research
Focused on the optimum delivery of disease prevention strategies, improved diagnostics, treatments and hospital care to patients around Australia.

Kidney, Transplant & Diabetes Research Australia (KTDRA) 
Kidney, Transplant & Diabetes Research Australia (KTDRA) is proud to support ground-breaking translational medical research that is helping to improve the lives of our family and friends suffering with these diseases. KTDRA’s aim is simple – to reduce and ultimately eliminate the high incidence of these chronic diseases in Australia and around the world.

Centre for Creative Health 
The Centre for Creative Health is driving collaboration, innovation and research to develop best-practice arts, design and health programs to improve the quality and experience of healthcare for patients, families and staff at the new Royal Adelaide Hospital (RAH) in Adelaide, as well as the wider community.

The Road Home 
The Road Home supports health and wellbeing research and programs for veterans, emergency service personnel and their families to strive for improved health models and outcomes for those who sacrifice so much by putting themselves in harm’s way to serve and protect our way of life.

Cure For Stroke Australia (CFSA) 
CFSA supports research undertaken through the Stroke Research Programme (SRP), a unique collaboration between the South Australian Health and Medical Research Institute (SAHMRI), University of Adelaide, the Central Adelaide Local Health Network (CALHN) and the Basil Hetzel Institute for Translational Health Research (BHI). The SRP has been instrumental in helping establish dedicated Stroke Treatment Units at major hospitals in Adelaide including the Royal Adelaide Hospital (RAH), The Queen Elizabeth Hospital (TQEH) and the Lyell McEwin Hospital (LMH).  Research conducted by the SRP is helping to improve response times and health outcomes for individuals who have a stroke.  Through innovative research the SRP is also striving to discover new therapies to overcome disability following stroke.

Under Our Roof 
Under Our Roof project provides accommodation for country cancer patients receiving treatment at The Queen Elizabeth Hospital, one of South Australia's busiest cancer treatment centres. It also has the state's largest breast cancer clinic.  Fund raising for the program has been supported by the Mercer SuperCycle.

Publications 
Research for life

References

External links

 Australian Breast Cancer
 Australian Prostate Cancer
 Australian Heart Research

Health charities in Australia
Research institutes established in 1965
1965 establishments in Australia
Organisations based in Adelaide
Medical and health organisations based in South Australia